Han Jun-hee (born 1985) is a South Korean film director and screenwriter. Han wrote and directed the female-driven crime thriller Coin Locker Girl (2015).

Filmography 
To Bite a Cigarette  (short film, 2005) - director
Once in a Summer (2006) - production support
BABO (2008) - assistant director
Understanding Movies (2013) - director
The Gifted Hands (2013) - screenwriter
Hwayi: A Monster Boy (2013) - production support
Coin Locker Girl (2015) - director, screenwriter
Hit-and-Run Squad (2019) - director
D.P. (2021) - director, screenwriter
Weak Hero Class 1 (2022) - creative director

Awards 
2016 52nd Baeksang Arts Awards: Best New Director (Film) for Coin Locker Girl

References

External links 
 
 
 

1985 births
Living people
South Korean film directors
South Korean screenwriters